Petty, or Pettie is a place and parish in Highland, Scotland.

The parishes of Petty and Bracholy, were united prior to the Reformation. The original parish church was dedicated to Saint Columba. William, Earl of Ross sacked the churches of Petty and Bracholy in 1281. The present parish church was built in 1839.

See also 
 List of listed buildings in Petty, Highland

References
The National Gazetteer of Great Britain and Ireland (1868)

Populated places in the County of Nairn
Civil parishes of Scotland